Frederick Goodwin may refer to:

Frederick K. Goodwin (1936–2020), psychiatrist
Sir Frederick Tutu Goodwin, Queen's Representative
Frederick D. Goodwin (1888–1968), bishop of the Episcopal Diocese of Virginia
Fred Goodwin (born 1958), Scottish banker
Freddie Goodwin (1933–2016), English footballer and cricketer
Freddie Goodwin (footballer, born 1944), former English footballer
Fred Goodwin (footballer) (1888–1945), English footballer who played in the Football League for Burnley

See also
Fred Goodwins (1891–1923), silent film actor and director